The European Patent Convention (EPC), also known as the Convention on the Grant of European Patents of 5 October 1973, is a multilateral treaty instituting the European Patent Organisation and providing an autonomous legal system according to which European patents are granted.  The term European patent is used to refer to patents granted under the European Patent Convention. However, a European patent is not a unitary right, but a group of essentially independent nationally enforceable, nationally revocable patents, subject to central revocation or narrowing as a group pursuant to two types of unified, post-grant procedures: a time-limited opposition procedure, which can be initiated by any person except the patent proprietor, and limitation and revocation procedures, which can be initiated by the patent proprietor only.

The EPC provides a legal framework for the granting of European patents, via a single, harmonised procedure before the European Patent Office (EPO). A single patent application, in one language, may be filed at the EPO in Munich, at its branch in The Hague, at its sub-office in Berlin, or at a national patent office of a Contracting State, if the national law of the State so permits.

History 
In September 1949, French Senator Henri Longchambon proposed to the Council of Europe the creation of a European Patent Office. His proposal, known as the "Longchambon plan", marked the beginning of the work on a European patent law aimed at a "European patent". His plan was however not found to be practicable by the Council's Committee of Experts in patent matters. The meetings of the Committee nevertheless led to two Conventions, one on the formalities required for patent applications (1953) and one on the international classification of patent (1954). The Council's Committee then carried on its work on substantive patent law, resulting in the signature of the Strasbourg Patent Convention in 1963.

In 1973, the Munich Diplomatic Conference for the setting up of a European System for the Grant of Patents took place and the Convention was then signed in Munich (the Convention is sometimes known as the "Munich Convention"). The signature of the Convention was the accomplishment of a decade-long discussion during which Kurt Haertel, considered by many as the father of the European Patent Organisation, and François Savignon played a decisive role.

The Convention was officially signed by 16 countries on October 5, 1973.

The Convention entered into force on 7 October 1977 for the following first countries: Belgium, Germany (then West Germany), France, Luxembourg, the Netherlands, Switzerland and the United Kingdom, and on 1 May 1978 for Sweden. However, the first patent applications were filed on 1 June 1978 (date fixed by the Administrative Council which held its first meeting on 19 October 1977).  Subsequently, other countries have joined the EPC.

The EPC is separate from the European Union (EU), and its membership is different; Switzerland, Liechtenstein, Turkey, Monaco, Iceland, Norway, North Macedonia, San Marino, Albania, Serbia, the United Kingdom, and Montenegro are party to the EPC but are not members of the EU. Further, the EU is not a party to the EPC, although all members of the EU are party to the EPC. The Convention is, as of October 2022, in force in 39 countries. Montenegro became the 39th Contracting State on 1 October 2022.

A diplomatic conference was held in November 2000 in Munich to revise the Convention, amongst other things to integrate in the EPC new developments in international law and to add a level of judicial review of the Boards of Appeal decisions. The revised text, informally called the EPC 2000, entered into force on 13 December 2007.

Cooperation agreements with non-contracting states: extension and validation agreements

Throughout the history of the EPC, some non-contracting States have concluded cooperation agreements with the European Patent Organisation, known as extension or validation agreements. These states then became "extension states" or "validation states", which means that European patents granted by the EPO may be extended to those countries through the payment of additional fees and completion of certain formalities. As is the case in EPO contracting states, the rights conferred to European patents validated/extended to these states are the same as national patents in those states. However, the extension of a European patent or patent application to these states is "not subject to the jurisdiction of the [EPO] boards of appeal."

As of October 2022, Bosnia and Herzegovina has an extension agreement with the EPO so that, in effect, this state can be designated in a European patent application. Several other "extension states" have since become states parties to the EPC. Furthermore, so-called "validation agreements" with Morocco, Moldova, Tunisia, and Cambodia are also in effect since 1 March 2015, 1 November 2015, 1 December 2017, and 1 March 2018, respectively. On 31 October 2019, a further validation agreement was signed with Georgia. As of 2 October 2020, that agreement is not yet in force.

Legal nature and content 

The European Patent Convention is "a special agreement within the meaning of Article 19 of the Convention for the Protection of Industrial Property, signed in Paris on 20 March 1883 and last revised on 14 July 1967, and a regional patent treaty within the meaning of Article 45, paragraph 1, of the Patent Cooperation Treaty of 19 June 1970." The European Patent Convention currently does not lead to the grant of centrally enforceable patents in all 39 countries, although the European Union patent would allow for unitary effect: centrally enforceability throughout 24 of the 27 countries of the European Union.

The content of the Convention includes several texts in addition to the main 178 articles. These additional texts, which are integral parts of the Convention, are:
 the "Implementing Regulations to the Convention on the Grant of European patents", commonly known as the "Implementing Regulations". The function of the Implementing Regulations is "to determine in more detail how the Articles should be applied". In case of conflict between the provisions of the EPC and those of the Implementing Regulations, the provisions of the EPC prevail.
 the "Protocol on Jurisdiction and the recognition of decisions in respect of the right to the grant of a European patent", commonly known as the "Protocol on Recognition". This protocol deals with the right to the grant of a European patent but exclusively applies to European patent applications.
 the "Protocol on Privileges and Immunities of the European Patent Organisation", commonly known as the "Protocol on Privileges and Immunities";
 the "Protocol on the Centralisation of the European Patent System and on its Introduction", commonly known as the "Protocol on Centralisation";
 the "Protocol on the Interpretation of Article 69 of the Convention";
 the "Protocol on the Staff Complement of the European Patent Office at The Hague", commonly known as the "Protocol on Staff Complement".

Substantive patent law 
One of the most important articles of the Convention, entitled  "Patentable inventions", states:

This article constitutes the "fundamental provision of the EPC which governs the patentability of inventions".

However, the EPC provides further indications on what is patentable. There are exclusions under Article 52(2) and (3) EPC and exclusions under Article 53 EPC.

First, discoveries, scientific theories, mathematical methods, aesthetic creations, schemes, rules and methods for performing mental acts, playing games or doing business, programs for computers and presentations of information are not regarded as inventions and are excluded from patentability only to the extent that the invention relates to those areas as such. This is "a negative, non-exhaustive list of what should not be regarded as an invention within the meaning of Article 52(1) EPC." (For further information, see also: Software patents under the EPC).

The second set of exclusions, or exceptions, include:
 Inventions contrary to "ordre public" or morality,
 Plant or animal varieties and essentially biological processes for the production of plants and animals, and
 Methods for treatment of the human or animal body by surgery or therapy, and diagnostic methods practised on the human or animal body, which have been excluded for "socio-ethical considerations and considerations of public health". Products, "in particular substances or compositions", for use in any of these therapeutic or diagnostic methods are not excluded from patentability, however.

Unified prosecution phase 

The Convention also includes provisions setting out filing requirements of European applications, the procedure up to grant, the opposition procedure and other aspects relating to the prosecution of patent applications under the Convention.

European patent applications may be filed in any language, but they are prosecuted only in one of the three official languages of the EPO – English, French and German. If an application is filed in another language than an official language, a translation must be filed into one of the three official languages, within two months from the date of filing. The official language of filing (or of the translation) is adopted as the "language of proceedings" and is used by the EPO for communications.

European patent applications are prosecuted in a similar fashion to most patent systems – the invention is searched and published, and subsequently examined for compliance with the requirements of the EPC.

During the prosecution phase, a European patent is a single regional proceeding, and "the grant of a European patent may be requested for one or more of the Contracting States." All Contracting States are considered designated upon filing of a European patent application. and the designations need to be "confirmed" later during the procedure through the payment of designation fees. Once granted by the EPO, a European patent comes into existence effectively as a group of national patents in each of the designated Contracting States.

Opposition

There are only two types of centrally executed procedures after grant, the opposition procedure and the limitation and revocation procedures. The opposition procedure, governed by the EPC, allows third parties to file an opposition against a European patent within 9 months of the date of grant of that patent. It is a quasi-judicial process, subject to appeal, which can lead to maintenance, maintenance in amended form or revocation of a European patent. Simultaneously to the opposition, a European patent may be the subject of litigation at a national level (for example an infringement dispute).  National courts may suspend such infringement proceedings pending outcome of the opposition proceedings to avoid proceedings running in parallel and the uncertainties that may arise from that.

Grant, effect and need for translations 
In contrast to the unified, regional character of a European patent application, the granted European patent does not comprise, in effect, any such unitary character, except for the opposition procedure. In other words, one European patent in one Contracting State is effectively independent of the same European patent in each other Contracting State, except for the opposition procedure.

A European patent confers rights on its proprietor, in each Contracting State in respect of which it is granted, from the date of publication of the mention of its grant in the European Patent Bulletin. That is also the date of publication of the B1 document, i.e. the European patent specification. This means that the European patent is granted and confers rights in all its designated Contracting States at the date of mention of the grant, whether or not a prescribed translation is filed with a national patent office later on (though the right may later be deemed never to have existed in any particular State if a translation is not subsequently filed in time, as described below).

A translation of a granted European patent must be filed in some EPC Contracting States to avoid loss of right. Namely, in the Contracting States which have "prescribe[d] that if the text, in which the European Patent Office intends to grant a European patent (...) is not drawn up in one of its official languages, the applicant for or proprietor of the patent shall supply to its central industrial property office a translation of this text in one of its official languages at his option or, where that State has prescribed the use of one specific official language, in that language". The European patent is void ab initio in a designated Contracting State where the required translation (if required) is not filed within the prescribed time limit after grant. In other Contracting States, no translation needs to be filed, for example in Ireland if the European patent is in English. In those Contracting States where the London Agreement is in force the requirement to file a translation of the European patent has been entirely or partially waived. If a translation is required, a fee covering the publication of said translation may be due as well.

Enforcement and validity 

Almost all attributes of a European patent in a Contracting State, i.e. ownership, validity, and infringement, are determined independently under respective national law, except for the opposition procedure, limitation procedure, and revocation procedure as discussed above. Though the EPC imposes some common limits, the EPC expressly adopts national law for interpretation of all substantive attributes of a European patent in a Contracting State, with a few exceptions.

Infringement
Infringement is remitted entirely to national law and to national courts. In one of its very few substantive interventions into national law, the EPC requires that national courts must consider the "direct product of a patented process" to be an infringement. The "extent of the protection" conferred by a European patent is determined primarily by reference to the claims of the European patent (rather than by the disclosure of the specification and drawings, as in some older patent systems), though the description and drawings are to be used as interpretive aids in determining the meaning of the claims. A "Protocol on the Interpretation of Article 69 EPC" provides further guidance, that claims are to be construed using a "fair" middle position, neither "strict, literal" nor as mere guidelines to considering the description and drawings, though of course even the protocol is subject to national interpretation. The authentic text of a European patent application and of a European patent are the documents in the language of the proceedings.

All other substantive rights attached to a European patent in a Contracting State, such as what acts constitute infringement (indirect and divided infringement, infringement by equivalents, extraterritorial infringement, infringement outside the term of the patent with economic effect during the term of the patent, infringement of product claims by processes for making or using, exports, assembly of parts into an infringing whole, etc.), the effect of prosecution history on interpretation of the claims, remedies for infringement or bad faith enforcement (injunction, damages, attorney fees, other civil penalties for wilful infringement, etc.), equitable defences, coexistence of an EP national daughter and a national patent for identical subject matter, ownership and assignment, extensions to patent term for regulatory approval, etc., are expressly remitted to national law.

For a period in the late-1990s, national courts issued cross-border injunctions covering all EP jurisdictions, but this has been limited by the European Court of Justice.  In two cases in July 2006 interpreting Articles 6.1 and 16.4 of the Brussels Convention, the European Court of Justice held that European patents are national rights that must be enforced nationally, that it was "unavoidable" that infringements of the same European patent have to be litigated in each relevant national court, even if the lawsuit is against the same group of companies, and that cross-border injunctions are not available.

Validity
Validity is also remitted largely to national law and national courts.  limits the application of national law to only the following grounds of invalidity, and specifies that the standards for each ground are those of national law:

 if the subject-matter of the European patent is not patentable within the terms of Articles 52 to 57 EPC (see "Substantive patent law" section above);
 if the disclosure does not permit the invention to be carried out by a person skilled in the art;
 if amendments have been made such that the subject-matter extends beyond the content of the application as filed;
 if the claims have been broadened post-grant, e.g. in opposition proceedings;
 an improper proprietor—in some jurisdictions, only the person pretending to be entitled to the European patent can raise this specific ground, so that the resulting nullity of the patent may be relative to some persons only—.

Term (duration) of a European patent 
The EPC requires all jurisdictions to give a European patent a term of 20 years from the filing date, the filing date being the actual date of filing an application for a European patent or the date of filing of an international application under the PCT designating the EPO. The filing date is not necessarily the priority date, which can be up to one year earlier.  The term of a granted European patent may be extended under national law if national law provides term extension to compensate for pre-marketing regulatory approval. For EEA member states this is by means of a supplementary protection certificate (SPC).

Relation with the Patent Cooperation Treaty 
A European patent application may result from the filing of an international application under the Patent Cooperation Treaty (PCT), i.e. the filing of a PCT application, and then the entry into "European regional phase", i.e. the transition from the international to the European procedural stages. The European patent application is therefore said to be a "Euro-PCT application" and the EPO is said to act as a designated or elected Office. In case of conflict between the provisions of the EPC and those of the PCT, the provisions of the PCT and its Regulations prevail over those of the EPC.

Twelve EPC Contracting States, namely Belgium, Cyprus, France, Greece, Ireland, Latvia, Malta, Monaco, Montenegro, the Netherlands, San Marino, and Slovenia, have "closed their national route". This means that, for these countries, it is not possible to obtain a national patent through the international (PCT) phase without entering into the regional European phase and obtaining a European patent. The "national route" for Italy was closed until June 30, 2020, but Italy then reopened it for PCT applications filed on or after 1 July 2020.

See also 
 Glossary of patent law terms
 Vienna Convention on the Law of Treaties (1969)

Notes

References

Further reading

External links 
 The European Patent Convention
 Legal texts from the European Patent Office (EPO), including the text of the European Patent Convention.

European patent law
European Patent Organisation
Patent law treaties
Business law
Treaties concluded in 1973
Treaties entered into force in 1977
Treaties of Albania
Treaties of Austria
Treaties of Belgium
Treaties of Bulgaria
Treaties of Switzerland
Treaties of Cyprus
Treaties of the Czech Republic
Treaties of Czechoslovakia
Treaties of West Germany
Treaties of Denmark
Treaties of Estonia
Treaties of Spain
Treaties of Finland
Treaties of France
Treaties of the United Kingdom
Treaties of Greece
Treaties of Croatia
Treaties of Hungary
Treaties of Ireland
Treaties of Iceland
Treaties of Italy
Treaties of Liechtenstein
Treaties of Lithuania
Treaties of Luxembourg
Treaties of Latvia
Treaties of Monaco
Treaties of North Macedonia
Treaties of Malta
Treaties of the Netherlands
Treaties of Norway
Treaties of Poland
Treaties of Portugal
Treaties of Romania
Treaties of Serbia
Treaties of Sweden
Treaties of Slovenia
Treaties of Slovakia
Treaties of Turkey
Treaties of San Marino
Treaties extended to the Netherlands Antilles
Treaties establishing intergovernmental organizations
Treaties extended to the Isle of Man
Treaties extended to Clipperton Island
Treaties extended to French Guiana
Treaties extended to French Polynesia
Treaties extended to the French Southern and Antarctic Lands
Treaties extended to Guadeloupe
Treaties extended to Martinique
Treaties extended to Mayotte
Treaties extended to New Caledonia
Treaties extended to Réunion
Treaties extended to Saint Pierre and Miquelon
Treaties extended to Wallis and Futuna